The First Gutai Art Exhibition took place in Ohara hall, Tokyo, Japan, in October 1955. This exhibition was the first manifestation of Gutai and displayed wide-ranging artworks created by a group of young artists formed around association leader Jiro Yoshihara. In the spirit of avant-garde, Gutai Artists challenged the formats, materials and boundaries of painting with innovative projects that explored space, time and sound. The group's interest was in direct emotion and direct connections between the spirit and the material with the goal of doing something completely unexpected to create art that was unrelated to the concepts of the past.

Background 

During the post war year, as Gutai was emerging, originality became embedded in discourses of individualism as a resistance against the mass physiology of Japan's militarist past. Painting, as it existed, was considered by the Gutai artists no longer be adequate to express the human condition. Artists were motivated to articulate a new form of expression that defined a new era of authenticity and creative autonomy. Jiro Yoshihara at this time, inspired by Jackson Pollock, started to explore art that goes beyond abstract painting into nontraditional process and the performative. In the invitation to the exhibition, Jiro Yoshihara articulated the goal of the Gutai artists:

“Today, the genre known as ‘pure art’ really seems to have come up against a huge wall. But with this outrageous methods and sincere approach, this new group of people is attempting to break right through that wall.” 

Artists challenged themselves to produce fresh and unconventional forms of art using everyday materials such as wood, water, plastics, newspaper, sheet metal, fabrics, sand, light, smoke, etc. Their aim was to open a dialog between the materials and the artist's spirit by attempting to transform the material into something new:

“Gutai art does not change the material: it brings it to life. Gutai art does not falsify the material. In Gutai art the human spirit and the material reach out their hands to each other, even though they are otherwise opposed to each other. The material is not absorbed by the spirit. The spirit does not force the material into submission. If one leaves the material as it is, presenting it just as material, then it starts to tell us something and speaks with a mighty voice.” 

As well as the exploration of non-art materials, they also experimented in such types of arts as performance art, installation art, sound art and multimedia art. The first show to demonstrate these new approaches was the “Experimental Outdoor Modern Art Exhibition to challenge the Midsummer Burning Sun” in Ashiya City, held three months before the first Gutai Exhibition in Tokyo. An outdoor piece displayed a clear bag of red liquid and sharp sheets of metal hanging from the trees and wooden posts scarred with axes and penetrated with nails. Continuing on this radicalism, the exhibition in Tokyo displayed a wider range of works highlighting the impact of physical action on materials. The works of Gutai artists caught the attention of artist Allan Kaprow, who saw them as prefiguring Happenings and of French critic Michel Tapie, who embraced the Gutai artists as contributors to the version of Abstract Expressionism he called Art Informel.

Participating Artists 

Akira Kanayama
Toshiko Kinoshita
Sadamasa Motonaga
Saburo Murakami
Itoko Ono
Shozo Shimamoto
Fujiko Shiraga
Kazuo Shiraga
Yasuo Sumi
Atsuko Tanaka
Chiyu Uemae
Yozo Ukita
Tsuruku Yamazaki
Toshio Yoshida
Jiro Yoshihara
Michio Yoshihara

Famous Works 

Challenging Mud by Kazuo Shiraga

Kazuo Shiraga flailed for twenty minutes in a heap of building clay in the country yard of Ohara Hall. For the remainder of the exhibition, the mud remained on view, identified by a signpost bearing the title of the work.

Making Six Holes in One Moment by Saburo Murakami

Saburo Murakami stretched several layers of packaging paper over two sets of wooden frames. He tore through the paper six times on the opening day, and the resulting work remained on view in the first room of the exhibition hall.

Work (Water) by Sadamasa Motonaga

To create Water, Motonaga filled clear plastic bags with colored water, which he hung at varying heights from the ceiling. The piece was installed near a window to achieve the full effect of sunlight passing through the transparent vessels.

Exhibition layout 
In the first room located on the first floor of the hall, were six works by Yasuo Sumi, eight works by Toshio Yoshida, and three works by Saburo Murakami including both frames from the performance Making Six Holes in One Moment. This room also displayed at least one of the twenty bells that formed Astuko Tanaka's Work(Bell). Activated by flipping a switch, the bells rang in sequence throughout the rooms of exhibition.

The second room included Tsuruko Yamazaki's 52 empty tin cans installed on the floor and Akira Kanayama's balloon hung from the ceiling. This room also included works by Murakami, Shozo Shimamoto, and Kazuo Shiraga's two abstract painting created by using his feet.

Fujiko Shiraga's floor path ran throughout the gallery. Beside the path there were a stripe work by Yamazaki, a small painting by Jiro Yoshihara, and Tanaka's Work, a hanging piece of pink fluorescent silk.

Critical reception 
The innovation in using new materials was appreciated by many critics. While there are still various kinds of doubts and offensive voices around the show, such as “From the viewpoint of the subconscious, the work is extremely simple.” “This is a new manifestation of Dada.” “Sensation alone is meaningless.”

See also 

Takesada Matsutani
Fluxus movement
Installation art
Abstract expressionism

References 

Altshuler, B., & Phaidon Press. (2008). Exhibitions that made art history. London: Phaidon.
Franciolli, M., Namioka, F., Della, C. B., & Museo cantonale d'arte (Lugano, Switzerland). (2010). Gutai: Dipingere con il tempo e lo spazio = painting with time and space : Akira 
Gomez, E. M. (2010). Matsutani's Moment. Art In America, 98(5), 136-143.
Kanayama [and others]. Cinisello Balsamo, Milano: Silvana.
Maerkle, A. (2012). GUTAI: THE SPIRIT OF AN ERA. Frieze, (150), 246.
Murai, M. (1955). Kansai Artists’ Offensive.
Tiampo, M. (2011). Gutai: Decentering modernism. Chicago: The University of Chicago Press.
Tiampo, M. (2007). ‘Create what has never been done before!’: Historicising Gutai Discourses of Originality. Third Text, 21(6), 689-706.
Singh, D. (2010). Tsuruko Yamazaki: Beyond Gutai 1955-2009. Art Asiapacific, (69), 124.
Yoshihara, J., & Ohara, H. (1955). Invitation to “The First Gutai Exhibition”.
Yoshihara, J. (1956). The Gutai Manifesto.

Bibliography 

Art exhibitions in Japan